"Turn it Loose" is a song written by Craig Bickhardt, Don Schlitz and Brent Maher, and recorded by American country music duo The Judds.  It was released in January 1988 as the fourth single from the album Heartland.  The song was their eleventh number one country single.  The single went to number one for one week and spent a total of twelve weeks on the country chart.

Chart performance
"Turn It Loose" debuted on the U.S. Billboard Hot Country Singles & Tracks for the week of January 16, 1988.

Weekly charts

Year-end charts

References

1988 singles
1987 songs
The Judds songs
Songs written by Don Schlitz
Songs written by Craig Bickhardt
RCA Records singles
Curb Records singles
Songs written by Brent Maher
Song recordings produced by Brent Maher